Littlewood is a surname, and may refer to:

 Alison Littlewood, British author
 Angela Littlewood (born 1949), English shot putter
 Barclay Littlewood (born 1978), British entrepreneur
 Chic Littlewood (1930–2015), New Zealand actor
 Clayton Littlewood (born 1963), English author
 David Littlewood (born 1955), English cricketer
 Dominic Littlewood (born 1965), British television presenter and entrepreneur
 Dudley E. Littlewood (1903–1979), British mathematician
 France Littlewood (1863–1941), British socialist
 George Littlewood Sr. (1857–1928), English cricketer
 George Littlewood Jr. (1882–1917), English cricketer
 Harry Littlewood (1921–2003), English actor
 Herbert Littlewood (1858–1925), English cricketer
 Ivan Littlewood (1902–1951), New Zealand rugby player
 Jesse Littlewood (1878–1942), English cricketer
 Jessica Littlewood, Canadian politician
 Joan Littlewood (1914–2002), British actress and theatre director
 John Edensor Littlewood (1885–1977), British mathematician
 John Littlewood (chess player) (1931–2009), British chess player
 Leslie Littlewood (1906–1989), British trade unionist
 Louise Littlewood, Australian politician
 Mark Littlewood (born 1972), Director General of the Institute of Economic Affairs
 Mike Littlewood (born 1966), American college baseball coach
 Norman Littlewood (1933–1989), British chess player
 Peter Littlewood (born 1955), British physicist
 Rick Littlewood (1940–2018), New Zealand judoka
 Roland Littlewood, British anthropologist and psychiatrist
 Stewart Littlewood (1905–1977), English footballer
 William Littlewood, American engineer
 Yvonne Littlewood (born 1927), British television director

See also
 Littlewoods, retail company
 Smallwood (disambiguation)